The Singapore Open Badminton Championships is an annual badminton tournament first created in 1928 by the Amateur Sporting Association as there was no national governing body for badminton in Singapore. In 1929, the Singapore Badminton Association (SBA) was established to promote the sport and organise competitions and its first official annual open championships was held in that same year. The Men's Singles was first contested officially in 1929. The tournament was canceled between 1942 to 1946 because of World War II and discontinued from 1974 to 1986. It returned in 1987 as Konica Cup and was held until 1999. There was no competition held in 1993, 1996 and 2000. The tournament returned in 2001 under a new sponsor. It was again canceled between 2020-2021 due to the COVID-19 pandemic. 

Below is the list of the winners at the Singapore Open in men's singles.

History
In the Amateur era, Wong Peng Soon (1938-1939, 1941, 1947-1949 and 1951) holds the record for the most titles in the Men's Singles, winning Singapore Open seven times. Wong also share the record for most consecutive titles of four from 1941 and 1947 to 1949 (no competition from 1942 to 1946) with E. J. Vass, 1929 to 1932 and Ong Poh Lim, 1952 to 1955 respectively.

Since the Open era of badminton began in late 1979, seven players (Zhao Jianhua, Hariyanto Arbi, Taufik Hidayat, Chen Hong, Boonsak Ponsana, Sony Dwi Kuncoro and Kento Momota) share the record for the most Men's Singles titles with two each. Chen Hong holds the record for most consecutive victories with two (in 2002 and 2003).

Finalists

Amateur era

Open era

Statistics

Multiple champions
Bold indicates active players.

Champions by country

Multiple finalists
Bold indicates active players.Italic indicates players who never won the championship.

See also
 List of Singapore Open women's singles champions
 List of Singapore Open men's doubles champions
 List of Singapore Open women's doubles champions
 List of Singapore Open mixed doubles champions

References

External links
Singapore Badminton Association
Badminton Asia

Singapore Open (badminton)